Sodium percarbonate is a chemical substance with formula . It is an adduct of sodium carbonate ("soda ash" or "washing soda") and hydrogen peroxide (that is, a perhydrate) whose formula is more properly written as 2  · 3 . It is a colorless, crystalline, hygroscopic and water-soluble solid.  It is sometimes abbreviated as SPC. It contains 32.5% by weight of hydrogen peroxide.

The product is used in some eco-friendly bleaches and other cleaning products[citation needed].

History
Sodium percarbonate was first prepared in 1899 by Russian chemist Sebastian Moiseevich Tanatar (7 October 1849 – 30 November 1917).

Structure
At room temperature, solid sodium percarbonate has the orthorhombic crystal structure, with the Cmca crystallographic space group.  The structure changes to Pbca as the crystals are cooled below about −30 °C.

Chemistry 
Dissolved in water, sodium percarbonate yields a mixture of hydrogen peroxide (which eventually decomposes to water and oxygen), sodium cations , and carbonate .

  2Na2CO3*3H2O2 -> 3H2O2 + 4Na+ + 2CO3^2- 
  2H2O2 -> 2H2O + O2

Production
Sodium percarbonate is produced industrially by crystallization of a solution of sodium carbonate and hydrogen peroxide,  with proper control of the pH and concentrations.  This is also a convenient laboratory method.

Alternatively, dry sodium carbonate may be treated directly with concentrated hydrogen peroxide solution.

It may also be formed from a process starting from sodium peroxide; when absolute ethyl alcohol reacts with sodium peroxide at 0°C, a perhydroxide is produced.

  +  → O:NaOH + .

Carbon dioxide converts it into sodium hydrogen percarbonate.

World production capacity of this compound was estimated at several hundred thousand tons for 2004.

Uses
As an oxidizing agent,  sodium percarbonate is an ingredient in a number of home and laundry cleaning products, including non-chlorine bleach products such as Oxyper, OxiClean, Tide laundry detergent, and Vanish.

Many commercial products mix a percentage of sodium percarbonate with sodium carbonate. The average "Oxy" product in the supermarket contains 35–40% sodium percarbonate with about 5% active oxygen when titrated.

Sodium percarbonate is also used as a cleaning agent in homebrewing.

Sodium percarbonate can be used in organic synthesis as a convenient source of anhydrous H2O2, in particular in solvents that cannot dissolve the carbonate but can leach the H2O2 out of it.  A method for generating trifluoroperacetic acid in situ for use in Baeyer–Villiger oxidations from sodium percarbonate and trifluoroacetic anhydride has been reported; it provides a convenient and cheap approach to this reagent without the need to obtain highly concentrated hydrogen peroxide.

References

External links
 Organic Chemistry Portal: Sodium percarbonate
 Consumer Product Information Database: Sodium percarbonate

Sodium compounds
Hydrogen peroxide
Carbonates
Cleaning product components
Antiseptics
Bleaches
Oxidizing agents